Brides to Be is a 1934 British comedy film directed by Reginald Denham and starring Betty Stockfeld, Constance Shotter and Ronald Ward. The film was made at Elstree Studios as a quota quickie for release by the British branch of Paramount Pictures.

Cast
 Betty Stockfeld as Audrey Bland  
 Constance Shotter as Maisie Beringer  
 Ronald Ward as George Hutton  
 Olive Sloane as Phyllis Hopper  
 Henry Oscar as Laurie Randall  
 Ivor Barnard as John Boyle  
 Gorgon McLeod as Snell

References

Bibliography
 Chibnall, Steve. Quota Quickies: The Birth of the British 'B' Film. British Film Institute, 2007.
 Low, Rachael. Filmmaking in 1930s Britain. George Allen & Unwin, 1985.
 Wood, Linda. British Films, 1927-1939. British Film Institute, 1986.

External links

1934 films
British comedy films
British black-and-white films
1934 comedy films
Films directed by Reginald Denham
British and Dominions Studios films
Films shot at Imperial Studios, Elstree
1930s English-language films
1930s British films
Quota quickies